Ivan Schranz (born 13 September 1993) is a Slovak footballer who plays for Slavia Prague and Slovakia as a forward or a winger.

Club career

Early career
Born in Bratislava, Schranz began his career in Inter Bratislava, later he played for Jozef Vengloš Academy and in 2010 he joined Petržalka. In January 2012, Schranz joined Spartak Trnava. On 5 May 2012, he made his league debut against Banská Bystrica. During his time in Trnava he played 125 matches, scoring 25 goals. With Trnava, he also earned his first appearance in European competition, and scored twice, in a UEFA Europa League qualifier against Scottish club St Johnstone.

Schranz joined Czech side Dukla Prague from Trnava in the summer of 2017. He played in Cyprus for AEL Limassol in the spring of 2019, before heading back to the Czech First League, where he signed a year-long contract with České Budějovice. Schranz impressed in his lone season at České Budějovice and joined Jablonec in July 2020, signing a three-year contract with the club. He continued his good form from the previous season, scoring 13 goals in 28 league games for Jablonec.

Slavia Prague
On 31 May 2021, it was announced that Schranz would be joining Slavia Prague on a long-term contract in advance of the 2021–22 season. On 30 July 2021, in only his second match for Slavia, Schranz scored a hat-trick in a league win over Teplice.

International career
In May 2021, Schranz was included in the stand-by list for Slovakia at the rescheduled UEFA Euro 2020 tournament. He would later be called up to the tournament but did not make an appearance.

Career statistics

Club

International
As of match played 10 June 2022. Scores and results list Slovakia's goal tally first.

Honours
AEL Limassol
 Cypriot Cup: 2018–19

References

External links 
 National-Football-Teams profile 
  
 Spartak Trnava profile 

1993 births
Living people
Footballers from Bratislava
Association football forwards
Slovak footballers
Slovakia youth international footballers
Slovakia under-21 international footballers
Slovakia international footballers
FC Petržalka players
FC Spartak Trnava players
AC Sparta Prague players
FK Dukla Prague players
SK Dynamo České Budějovice players
AEL Limassol players
FK Jablonec players
SK Slavia Prague players
2. Liga (Slovakia) players
Slovak Super Liga players
Czech First League players
Cypriot First Division players
UEFA Euro 2020 players
Expatriate footballers in the Czech Republic
Expatriate footballers in Cyprus
Slovak expatriate sportspeople in the Czech Republic
Slovak expatriate sportspeople in Cyprus
Slovak people of Austrian descent